The 2015 ICC Europe Under-19 Championship was an international cricket tournament held in Jersey, from 11 to 18 July 2015. The winner of the tournament, Scotland, qualified directly for the 2016 Under-19 World Cup, while the runner-up, Ireland, will play the other runners-up from regional qualifying tournaments at the 2015 World Cup Qualifier, with the winner of that tournament also qualifying for the World Cup.

Fixtures

Statistics

Most runs
The top five runscorers are included in this table, ranked by runs scored and then by batting average.

Source: CricHQ

Most wickets

The top five wicket takers are listed in this table, ranked by wickets taken and then by bowling average.

Source: CricHQ

External links
 European Under 19 World Cup Qualifier 2015 at CricketEurope

References 

Under-19 regional cricket tournaments
International cricket competitions in 2015
2015 in Jersey
International cricket competitions in Jersey